A Single Drop of Red is the first EP and second release overall by the hard rock/electronica duo Anarchy Club, released in December 2007.

The EP features the two already released tracks "Collide" (from Guitar Hero II in 2006), and "Blood Doll" (from Rock Band in 2007), three all new unreleased songs, and six new remixes to six of the songs from the band's debut LP, The Way and Its Power.

Track listing
All songs written by Keith Smith and Adam von Buhler, except "No You Don't" by Chapman & Chinn.

 "Graveyard Stickshift" – 2:55
 "Collide" – 3:15
 "Blood Doll" – 2:30
 "A Single Drop of Red" – 4:12
 "No You Don't" – 3:27
 "Interlude" – 0:18
 "Shaolin (Wudang Style)" – 3:06
 "Behind the Mask (Qigong Mix)" – 3:37
 "King of Everything (Kalari Mix)" – 4:57
 "Enemy Ace (Anarkey Lime Pie Mix)" – 5:00
 "Behind the Mask (Dopplo Machiatto Mix)" – 2:50
 "Shadow of a Ghost (Guilty Remix)" – 5:07

Personnel
Keith Smith – lead vocals, guitar
Adam von Buhler – bass, guitar, drums, synthesizer, keyboards

References

Anarchy Club albums
2007 EPs